The Arrowhead League is a high school athletic league that is part of the CIF Southern Section. Its member schools are located around Riverside, California, and include five independent schools, one public school, and the United States Bureau of Indian Education operated Sherman Indian High School.

Members
 California Lutheran High School	
 California School for the Deaf, Riverside
 Hamilton High School
 La Sierra Academy
 Sherman Indian High School
 United Christian Academy

Football-only members
 Riverside Preparatory School

References

CIF Southern Section leagues